AS Franz Krull was a metal works and engineering company in Tallinn, Estonia. It was founded by German industrialist Franz Krull in 1865 in Narva and in 1875 it was moved to Tallinn. The company manufactured different products, including steam locomotives, equipment for power plants and oil shale industry, and agricultural machinery. During the Soviet occupation the company was nationalized, and it became one of the largest contractors for the Soviet gas industry.

History
The company was founded on 25 April 1865 when German brazier Franz Joachim Heinrich Krull rented from the city of Narva a coppersmith workshop, which was belonged to deceased Friedrich Ludwig Büll. The main product of the newly established company became distillation apparatuses.  In 1870 it introduced the new type of distillation apparatus which had higher efficiency and quality than other models of that time. That business created enough revenue to buy out the workshop.

In 1875, Franz Krull sold the workshop in Narva and moved the industry to Tallinn. In 1895, Franz Krull sons Franz Krull II and Gerhard Krull took over the management of the company. In 1899, the industry moved to the Kalamaja district in Tallinn. The company also produced boilers, e.g. for the Tallinn Power Plant and locomotives, cisterns and tanks, filters and pumps, transmissions and gears, equipment for lumber mills and copper smithies, and various cast iron products. Production of the distillery equipment decreased but continued to be a part of the production portfolio. Before World War I AS Franz Krull received a number of contracts from the Russian military sector, particularly from three shipyards in Tallinn which were established in 1912–1913. As a result, the company had 400 employees in 1913. The company also started to manufacture high-capacity refrigeration and ice-making equipment.

When World War I started, Gerhard Krull was in Germany and cannot return to Estonia. As a German national, he was afraid of confiscation of the company. To avoid this, the ownership was transferred to his brother-in-law, who immediately sold the company to the Azov–Don Commercial Bank and fled with money.  Franz Krull II continued as a director of the company until his death in 1917.  During the war, the company manufactured water desalination systems for cruisers, cooling systems and boilers for cargo ships, and various machines and equipment for fortresses.

In the beginning of the independence of Estonia, AS Franz Krull was taken over by German financiers.  Later it was listed  at the Tallinn stock exchange.  The company manufactured mainly cast iron consumer goods.  In 1927, it started to manufacture equipment for the oil shale industry. Between 1927 and 1938, it manufactured four tunnel ovens for the oil shale company Eesti Kiviõli. In 1938, the Glen Davis Shale Oil Works in Australia planned to order two tunnel ovens from AS Franz Krull; however, due to time and budget constraints the deal was not finalized.  In 1931, AS Franz Krull manufactured its first steam locomotive. The company continued to manufacture refrigeration equipment, which in addition to the Estonian market was exported to Lithuania, but occasionally also to India, Iran, the United Kingdom, Yugoslavia, Romania, and Bulgaria. The company produced also road construction machinery, peat industry machinery, agricultural machinery, and boilers.

After the start of the Soviet occupation, the company was nationalized and renamed Punane Krull (meaning Red Krull). After the start of the World War II, the equipment of the metal works and employees were transferred to Russia to avoid capture by German forces.  During the German occupation the  metal works continued to work in Tallinn under German administration.

After restoration of the Soviet rule in Estonia, the company was renamed Plant No. 9 of the Main Department of Synthetic Liquid Fuel and Gas in 1945. The plant specialized in the production of equipment for the oil shale and natural gas industry, as well as lifting equipment. In 1949, it was renamed Tallinn Machinery Plant. The plant production included large-scale ventilators, centrifugal pumps, high-power steam boilers, conveyors, and elevators.  Its drilling rigs were used in addition to the Soviet Union also in Albania, Romania, China and several Arab countries.

In 1955, the plant was placed under the USSR Oil and Gas Industry Construction Ministry, which focused on the construction of construction machinery. In 1963, the plant started manufacturing air-cooled heat exchangers. In 1971, the plant was named after the communist politician Johannes Lauristin.

After Estonia regained independence, the plant was privatized in 1993. As of 2018, it is named OÜ Tallinna Masinatehas, and it concentrated on production of heat exchangers.

References

Bibliography
 

Engineering companies of Estonia
Technology companies of Estonia
1865 establishments in Estonia
Manufacturing companies established in 1865
Manufacturing companies of the Soviet Union
Companies nationalised by the Soviet Union